Spinestis is a genus of spiders in the family Oonopidae, which resembles Tapinesthis and Megaoonops. The genus has a single species, Spinestis nikita. These are found to be distributed in and around the southern shores of Crimean Peninsula, Ukraine.

References

External links 
 http://eol.org/pages/10696248/overview

Oonopidae
Spiders of Europe
Biota of Crimea
Monotypic Araneomorphae genera
Endemic fauna of Crimea